FeMoco ( cofactor) is the primary cofactor of nitrogenase. Nitrogenase is the enzyme that catalyzes the conversion of atmospheric nitrogen molecules N2 into ammonia (NH3) through the process known as nitrogen fixation. Studying FeMoco's role in the reaction mechanism for nitrogen fixation is a potential use case for quantum computers. Even limited quantum computers could enable better simulations of the reaction mechanism. 

Because it contains iron and molybdenum, the cofactor is called FeMoco. Its stoichiometry is Fe7MoS9C.

Structure 
The FeMo cofactor is a cluster with composition Fe7MoS9C. Fe is the chemical symbol for the element iron (ferrum), and Mo is the symbol for molybdenum. This large cluster can be viewed as two subunits composed of one Fe4S3 (iron(III) sulfide) cluster and one MoFe3S3 cluster. The two clusters are linked by three sulfide ligands and a bridging carbon atom. The unique iron (Fe) is anchored to the protein by a cysteine. It is also bound to three sulfides, resulting in tetrahedral molecular geometry. The additional six Fe centers in the cluster are each bonded to three sulfides. These six internal Fe centers define a trigonal prismatic arrangement around a central carbide center. The molybdenum is attached to three sulfides and is anchored to the protein by the imidazole group of a histidine residue. Also bound to Mo is a bidentate homocitrate cofactor, leading to octahedral geometry. Crystallographic analysis of the MoFe protein initially proposed the geometry of FeMoco, which was confirmed by extended X-ray absorption fine-structure (EXAFS) studies. The Fe-S, Fe-Fe and Fe-Mo distances were determined to be 2.32, 2.64, and 2.73 Å respectively.

Biosynthesis 
Biosynthesis of FeMoco is a complicated process that requires several Nif gene products, specifically those of nifS, nifQ, nifB, nifE, nifN, nifV, nifH, nifD, and nifK (expressed as the proteins NifS, NifU, etc.). FeMoco assembly is proposed to be initiated by NifS and NifU which mobilize Fe and sulfide into small Fe-S fragments. These fragments are transferred to the NifB scaffold and arranged into a Fe7MoS9C cluster before transfer to the NifEN protein (encoded by nifE and nifN) and rearranged before delivery to the MoFe protein. Several other factors participate in the biosynthesis. For example, NifV is the homocitrate synthase that supplies homocitrate to FeMoco. NifV, a protein factor, is proposed to be involved in the storage and/or mobilization of Mo. Fe protein is the electron donor for MoFe protein6. These biosynthetic factors have been elucidated and characterized with the exact functions and sequence confirmed by biochemical, spectroscopic, and structural analyses.

Identity of the core atom 
The three proteins that play a direct role in the M-cluster synthesis are NifH, NifEN, and NifB. The NifB protein is responsible for the assembly of the Fe-S core of the cofactor; a process that involves stitching together two [4Fe-4S] clusters. NifB belongs to the SAM (S-adenosyl-L-methionine) enzyme superfamily. During the biosynthesis of the FeMo cofactor, NifB and its SAM cofactor are directly involved in the insertion of a carbon atom at the center of the Fe-S complex. An equivalent of SAM donates a methyl group, which becomes the interstitial carbide of the M-cluster. The methyl group of SAM is mobilized by radical removal of an H by a 5’-deoxyadenosine radical (5’-dA·). Presumably, a transient –CH2· radical is formed that is subsequently incorporated into the metal cluster forming a Fe6-carbide species. The interstitial carbon remains associated with the FeMo cofactor after insertion into the nitrogenase, The central carbon atom has been confirmed by 13C labeling with detection by pulsed EPR spectroscopy. In addition to EPR spectroscopy, X-ray diffractometry was used to verify that there was a central atom in the middle of the FeMo cofactor and x-ray emission spectroscopic studies showed that central atom was carbon due to the 2p→1s carbon-iron transition. The use of X-ray crystallography showed that while the FeMo cofactor is not in its catalytic form, the carbon keeps the structure rigid which helps describe the reactivity of nitrogenase.

Electronic properties 
According to the analysis by electron paramagnetic resonance spectroscopy, the resting state of the FeMo cofactor has a spin state of S=3/2. Upon one-electron reduction, the cofactor becomes EPR silent. Understanding the process in which an electron is transferred in the protein adduct shows a more precise kinetic model of the FeMo cofactor. Density functional theory calculations have suggested that the formal oxidation state is MoIV-2FeII-5FeIII-C4−-H+, but the "true" oxidation states have not been confirmed experimentally.

Substrate binding 
The location of substrate attachment to the complex has yet to be elucidated. It is believed that the Fe atoms closest to the interstitial carbon participate in substrate activation, but the terminal molybdenum is also a candidate for nitrogen fixation.

Isolation 
Isolation of the FeMo cofactor from nitrogenase is done through centrifugal sedimentation of nitrogenase into the MoFe protein and the Fe protein. The FeMo cofactor is extracted by treating the MoFe protein with acids. The first extraction is done with N,N-dimethylformamide and the second by a mixture of N-methylformamide and Na2HPO4 before final sedimentation by centrifugation.

References 

Cluster chemistry
Iron–sulfur proteins
Iron(III) compounds
Sulfur compounds
Metalloproteins
Molybdenum(IV) compounds
Cofactors
Molybdenum enzymes